Stanisław Kur (born 13 November 1929, in Dzięcioły Bliższe) is Polish biblical scholar and Roman Catholic priest.

Biography 

After studies at Metropolitan Higher Seminary in Warsaw ordained priest in 1953. He obtained a post-doctorate diploma (habilitation) in 1990 with a dissertation entitled Life of Marha Krestos. During the years 1982-1997 he was a rector of seminary in Warsaw.

He is retired extraordinary professor at Pontifical Faculty of Theology in Warsaw (PWTW). He was lecturing in biblical theology, Old Testament Exegesis and Biblical languages at the PWTW and the University of Cardinal Stefan Wyszynski.

At present, he is Episcopal Vicar of The Archdiocese of Warsaw and protonotary apostolic (from 1999).

References

1929 births
Living people
20th-century Polish Roman Catholic priests
Stanislaw
Roman Catholic biblical scholars
21st-century Polish Roman Catholic priests
People from Sokołów County